Allan David Karlander (born November 5, 1946) is a Canadian retired professional ice hockey player who played 212 games in the National Hockey League between 1969 and 1973 and 269 games in the World Hockey Association between 1973 and 1977. He was the first collegiate player selected in the NHL Draft. He played for the Detroit Red Wings, New England Whalers, and Indianapolis Racers.

Career statistics

Regular season and playoffs

Awards and honors

References

External links 
 

1946 births
Living people
AHCA Division I men's ice hockey All-Americans
Canadian ice hockey centres
Cape Codders players
Detroit Red Wings draft picks
Detroit Red Wings players
Fort Worth Wings players
Ice hockey people from British Columbia
Indianapolis Racers players
Michigan Tech Huskies men's ice hockey players
New England Whalers players